The K class were the largest submarines built for the Soviet Navy in the World War II era.

Design

The design was approved in 1936 as a long range "cruiser submarine" with a heavy torpedo and gun armament. The boats could operate as a "fleet submarine" working with the battle fleet or as long range commerce raiders.

The double hull was divided into seven compartments. It was originally planned to carry a small floatplane for scouting but this concept was abandoned when the planned aircraft proved too flimsy.

Yakubov and Worth state that these were the most successful Soviet submarines of the World War II era, with high speed and good seakeeping. This class of submarine possessed better ventilation and air conditioning systems than any other class of Soviet submarine in World War II. They had amenities such as a bunk for every sailor, small cabins for each officer, showers, electric heaters (this class was designed to operate primarily in the Arctic), and an electric galley. The hull provided spacious accommodation. Diving time was 60 seconds. American naval constructors inspected K-21 in 1944, and thought the design to be workmanlike but technically inferior to contemporary American boats  such as the s

An improved design, the KU class, which was to be of welded construction was in planning in 1941. 24 KU boats were planned, but none were started.

Boats

All twelve boats were built by Marti Yard / Ordzhinikidze Yard, Leningrad, on the Baltic Sea, for the Soviet Northern Fleet. K-1 to K-23 were transferred before the German Invasion, and K-51 to K-56 were trapped in Leningrad during the blockade; they were completed after the war and transferred to the Arctic
 
 Laid down 27 December 1936
 Launched 4 May 1938
 Commissioned 26 May 1940
 Lost October 1943, mined in the Kara Sea
 K-2
 Laid down 27 December 1936
 Launched 4 May 1938
 Commissioned 26 May 1940
 Lost August/September 1942
 
 Laid down 27 December 1936
 Launched 1938
 Commissioned 19 December 1940
 Sunk 21 March 1943 by German anti-submarine vessels near Båtsfjord, Norway
 
 Laid down 10 December 1937
 Launched 16 August 1939
 Commissioned 3 February 1941
 
 Laid down 5 January 1938
 Launched 3 November 1938,
 Commissioned 7 August 1940
 Sunk 7 February 1943 by mines
 
 Laid down 5 February 1938
 Launched 28 April 1939
 Commissioned 25 October 1940
 Sunk 12 May 1942 by German anti-submarine vessels commanded by Wolfgang Kaden near Olesa Fjord, Norway, the boat was commanded by Magomet Gadzhiyev
 
 Launched 1939
 Decommissioned in 1955, scrapped
 K-52
 Launched 1939
 Decommissioned in 1955, scrapped
 K-53
 Launched 1939
 Decommissioned in 1954, scrapped
 K-54
 Launched 1941
 Not commissioned, scrapped
 K-55
 Launched 1941
 Decommissioned in 1954, scrapped
 
 Launched 1940
 Sunk in 1957 at nuclear trials

References

 Conway's All the World's Fighting Ships 1922–1946
 Vladimir Yakubov and Richard Worth, Raising the Red Banner −2008 Spellmount 

Submarine classes
 
 
Russian and Soviet navy submarine classes